Bordelon is a surname. Notable people with the surname include:

Gerald Bordelon (1962–2010), American convicted murderer
Guy Bordelon (1922–2002), Korean War flying ace
Ken Bordelon (born 1954), American football player
Melinda Bordelon (1949–1995), American painter and illustrator
William J. Bordelon (1920–1943), US Marine and recipient of the Medal of Honor
USS Bordelon, the ship named for him